Gmina Wojsławice is a rural gmina (administrative district) in Chełm County, Lublin Voivodeship, in eastern Poland.

Villages
Gmina Wojsławice contains the villages and settlements of Czarnołozy, Cztery Słupy, Góra Blachowa, Góra Łosiów, Góra Pudełkowa, Huta, Krasne, Kukawka, Majdan, Majdan Kukawiecki, Majdan Ostrowski, Nowy Majdan, Ostrów, Ostrów-Kolonia, Partyzancka Kolonia, Pohulanka, Popławy, Przecinek, Putnowice Wielkie, Putnowice-Kolonia, Rozięcin, Stadarnia, Stary Majdan, Trościanka, Turowiec, Witoldów, Wojsławice, Wólka Putnowicka and Zadebra.

Neighbouring gminas
Gmina Wojsławice is bordered by the gminas of Białopole, Grabowiec, Kraśniczyn, Leśniowice, Uchanie and Żmudź.

References
Polish official population figures 2006

Wojslawice
Chełm County